Sir Simon Alexander Bowes-Lyon  (born 17 June 1932) is a first cousin of Queen Elizabeth II and was Lord Lieutenant of Hertfordshire from 1986 to 2007. He was created a Knight Commander of the Royal Victorian Order in The Queen's Birthday Honours List 2005.

He was born in 1932, the son of Sir David Bowes-Lyon (2 May 1902 – 13 September 1961), who also served as Lord Lieutenant of Hertfordshire, and Rachel Pauline Spender-Clay (19 January 1907 – 21 January 1996), younger daughter of Herbert Spender-Clay. Through his father, he is a member of the Bowes-Lyon family, and through his mother, the Astor family.

On 11 April 1966, he married Caroline Mary Victoria Pike (b. 27 September 1940) and they have four children:
 Rosemary Pema “Rosie” Bowes-Lyon (b. 1968), married on 7 September 1996 to Nicholas David Kirkland Glazebrook, they have three children.
 Fergus Alexander Bowes-Lyon (b. 1970), married in 2000 to Frances Margaret Anne Harris, they have two children.
 David Victor Bowes-Lyon (b. 1973), married in 2002 to Jennifer Hurst (b. 1977), they have one son: William David Bowes-Lyon
 Andrew Simon Bowes-Lyon (b. 1979), married on 2 June 2012 to Melanie Fletcher, they have three daughters.

Sir Simon Bowes-Lyon currently resides in St Paul's Walden Bury.

See also
Burke's Peerage

References

1932 births
Living people
Simon Alexander Bowes-Lyon
High Sheriffs of Hertfordshire
Knights Commander of the Royal Victorian Order
Lord-Lieutenants of Hertfordshire